Christian terrorism, a form of religious terrorism, comprises terrorist acts which are committed by groups or individuals who profess Christian motivations or goals. Christian terrorists justify their violent tactics through their interpretation of the Bible and Christianity, in accordance with their own objectives and worldview.

These terroristic acts can be committed against members of other Christian denominations, adherents of other religions, secular governments, groups, individuals or society as a whole. Christianity can also be cynically used as a rhetorical device to achieve political or military goals by terrorists.

Christian terrorist groups include paramilitary organizations, cults, and loose groups of people that might come together in order to attempt to terrorize other groups. Some groups also encourage unaffiliated individuals to commit terrorist acts. The paramilitary groups are typically tied to ethnic and political goals as well as religious goals and many of these groups have religious beliefs which are at odds with the religious beliefs of conventional Christianity.

Terminology 
The literal use of the phrase Christian terrorism is disputed. It appears in the academic literature to describe a large range of actions and beliefs.

Religion can be cited as the motivation for terrorism in conflicts that have a variety of ethnic, economic and political causes, such as the one in Bosnia. In cases such as the Lord's Resistance Army or the Taiping Rebellion the beliefs of the founders differ significantly from what is recognizably Christian. In such cases the term Christian terrorism is problematic despite the claim that they are motivated by their religious beliefs.

The term terrorist can also be applied for disingenuous reasons, to encourage public support for a groups vilification or allow the use of stricter laws in punishing a group or individual. The intimidation of minority communities along with sporadic acts of violence do not typically get referred to as terrorism. However, in 2015 a majority of Americans from the Democratic and Republican political parties thought that "attacks on abortion providers [should] be considered domestic terrorism".

History 

There is no record of early Christian groups attempting to use acts of terrorism or indiscriminate acts of violence as religious weapons. Christianity came to prominence in the Roman Empire during and directly after the rule of Constantine the Great (324-337 AD). By this time it had spread throughout western Asia as a minority belief and it became the state religion of Armenia. In early Christianity there were many rival sects, which were collectively persecuted by some rulers.

Gaining state backing by a particular Christian sect or creed led to an increase in religious violence. This violence took the form of persecution of adherents of rival Christian beliefs and persecution of adherents of other religions. In Europe during the Middle Ages Christian antisemitism increased and both the Reformation and Counter-Reformation led to an increase in interdenominational violence. As with modern examples it is debated as to what extent these acts were religious as opposed to ethnic or political in nature.

Gunpowder Plot 

The early modern period in Britain saw religious conflict resulting from the Reformation and the recusancy that emerged in opposition to it. The Gunpowder Plot of 1605 was a failed attempt by a group of English Catholics to assassinate the Protestant King James I, and to blow up the Palace of Westminster, the English seat of government. Although the modern concept of religious terrorism, or indeed terrorism at all, had not yet come into use in the seventeenth century, David C. Rapoport and Lindsay Clutterbuck point out that the Plot, with its use of explosives, was an early precursor of nineteenth century anarchist terrorism. Sue Mahan and Pamala L. Griset classify the plot as an act of religious terrorism, writing that "Fawkes and his colleagues justified their actions in terms of religion." Peter Steinfels also characterizes this plot as a notable case of religious terrorism.

Pogroms 

Eastern Orthodox Christian-influenced movements in Romania, such as the Iron Guard and Lăncieri, which have been characterized by Yad Vashem and Stanley G. Payne as antisemitic and fascist, respectively, were involved in the Bucharest pogrom and committed numerous politically motivated murders during the 1930s.

Ku Klux Klan 

After the American Civil War of 1861–1865, former Confederate soldiers founded the Ku Klux Klan (KKK) organization. Originally, the Ku Klux Klan was a social club, but a year after it was founded, it was taken over by "night rider" elements. It then began to commit acts of violence which included arson, beatings, the destruction of property, lynchings, murder, rape, tarring and feathering, whipping, and voter intimidation. The Klan targeted newly freed slaves, carpetbaggers, scalawags, and the occupying Union Army. That iteration of the Klan disappeared by the 1870s, but in 1915 a new Protestant-led iteration of the Klan was formed in Georgia, during a period when racism, xenophobia, nativism and anti-Catholicism were all widespread. This version of the Klan vastly expanded its geographical reach and its list of targets over those of the original Klan.

Vehemently anti-Catholic, the 1915 Klan espoused an explicitly Protestant Christian terrorist ideology, partially basing its beliefs on a "religious foundation" in Protestant Christianity and targeting Jews, Catholics, and other social, ethnic and religious minorities, as well as people who engaged in "immoral" practices such as adulterers, bad debtors, gamblers, and alcohol abusers. From an early time onward, the goals of the KKK included an intent to "reestablish Protestant Christian values in America by any means possible", and it believed that "Jesus was the first Klansman". Although members of the KKK swear to uphold Christian morality, virtually every Christian denomination has officially denounced the KKK.

From 1915 onward, "second era" Klansmen initiated cross burnings (adapted from scenes in the 1915 film The Birth of a Nation), not only to intimidate targets, but also to demonstrate their respect and reverence for Jesus Christ. The ritual of lighting crosses was steeped in Christian symbolism, including prayer and hymn singing. Modern Klan organizations remain associated with acts of domestic terrorism in the United States.

Start of modern terrorism 
Mark Juergensmeyer, a former president of the American Academy of Religion, has argued that there has been a global rise in religious nationalism after the Cold War due to the post-colonial collapse of confidence in Western models of nationalism and the rise of globalization. Juergensmeyer categorizes contemporary Christian terrorists as being a part of "religious activists from Algeria to Idaho, who have come to hate secular governments with an almost transcendent passion and dream of revolutionary changes that will establish a godly social order in the rubble of what the citizens of most secular societies regard as modern, egalitarian democracies".

According to terrorism expert David C. Rapoport, a "religious wave", or a cycle, of terrorism, dates from approximately 1979 to the present. According to Rapoport, this wave most prominently features Islamic terrorism, but it also includes terrorism by Christians and other religious groups that may have been influenced by Islamic terrorism.

Reason for claiming a Christian motivation 
Numerous individuals and groups have cited their Christianity or Christian beliefs as the motivation for their terrorist acts. This can mean that they see Christianity as their identity and the main reason for their existence, partially in contrast to the identities and existence of other groups which they consider threatening and non-Christian. Terrorists can also cite their interpretation of the Bible or Christian beliefs as their motivation. All types of terrorism have a complex interrelationship with psychology and mental health, however only a minority of terrorists have diagnosable medical illnesses. Christianity can also be disingenuously claimed as a motive to inspire followers or curry political favor or protection. All these motivations are not independent and often complexly interwoven.

Christianity as an identity 
Religion is often closely tied to ethnic identity, economic standing and self image. Should a group of Christians feel threatened, religion is a verifiable, culturally important label to use in creating a "them-and-us" mentality. This is particularly the case where both groups share membership in a broadly similar cultural group, for example the breakup of Yugoslavia and the Lord's Resistance Army in Uganda. In situations where the opposing ethnicities are more diverse, different skin colors and/or cultural practices are sometimes used as identifiers of the other. In these cases terrorists may call themselves Christians, but they may not be motivated by any particular interpretation of Christian beliefs. In such cases Christianity is a label which reflects cultural, rather than directly ideological, influences.

This cultural Christian identity is often reinforced in the mind of the terrorist by media and governmental sources that vilify the other group or amplify its threat. This politicizing of ethno-religious tensions is a key contributor to the violence in the Central African Republic. The targets of this kind of terrorist motivation include other religions or denominations, but they can also include those who the perpetrator believes are threatening to him or her in any way, such as LGBT people or members of any group which does not conform to the perpetrator's view of who they are.

When the opposing group is also Christian but belongs to a different denomination, it is often denounced as non-Christian or anti-Christian. For example, the leader of the Orange Volunteers, who described themselves as Protestant fundamentalists, defended their attacks on Catholic churches on the basis that they were "bastions of the Antichrist".

Interpretations of Christian morality or theology 
Perpetrators have frequently cited their very individual forms of Christianity as both a justification and a motivation for their actions. Typically, as with attacks on abortion clinics as well as with attacks on LGBT people, the perpetrators use a nuanced negativity from an established Church as a justification for unsanctioned acts of violence. However, they may also have a wholly individual theology that is unrecognizable as established Christian dogma. Conventional Christian Bible interpretations also offer a number of sanctions against violence as a political or religious weapon.

On 12 December 2022, a fundamentalist Christian terror attack that resulted in the deaths of six people deaths occurred in Wieambilla, Australia. Premillennialism was cited by police as the terrorists' motivation.

Mental health 
There are a wide variety of mental health conditions and illness, and it is quite rare for them to lead to violence. Objectively determining the mental health of a terrorist is often complicated by a number of factors. There is minimal statistically robust information specifically on terrorists who claim Christian motivation. However, Gill et al 2014 claims that about 30% of right wing, 52% of single issue and 25% of Al Qaeda related individual terrorists and 8% of those in a terrorist group have a mental illness. Another study found that about 53% of individual terrorists could have been characterized as socially isolated before their attacks. People in some terrorist groups are less likely to have a mental illness than the general population, due to the selection criteria of such groups. Mental illness does not seem to unduly prevent terrorists from performing successful complex attacks.

Tactics of terrorists 

Terrorists who claim to have a Christian motivation can act alone or in groups. It is often difficult to determine if the perpetrator acted completely alone or was inspired by a religious or political group. The same problem exists with Islamic terrorism or any allegedly religiously or politically motivated act of terror.

Anti-abortion violence 

On 16 July 2001, Peter James Knight walked into the East Melbourne Fertility Clinic, a private abortion provider, carrying a rifle and other weapons including 16 litres of kerosene, three lighters, torches, 30 gags, and a handwritten note that read "We regret to advise that as a result of a fatal accident involving some members of staff, we have been forced to cancel all appointments today". Knight later stated that he intended to massacre everyone in the clinic, and attack all Melbourne abortion clinics. He developed homemade mouth gags and door jambs to restrain all patients and staff inside a clinic while he doused them with the kerosene. He shot 44-year-old Stephen Gordon Rogers, a security guard, in the chest, killing him. Staff and clients overpowered him soon after. He intended to massacre the 15 staff and 26 patients at the clinic by burning them alive.

According to psychiatrist Don Sendipathy, Knight interpreted the Bible in his own unique way and he also believed in his own brand of Christianity. He believed that he needed to wage an anti-abortion Crusade.

Eric Robert Rudolph (the perpetrator of the Centennial Olympic Park bombing in 1996) carried out bombing attacks on two abortion clinics and he also bombed a lesbian nightclub. Michael Barkun, a professor at Syracuse University, believes that Rudolph likely fits the definition of a Christian terrorist; however, James A. Aho, a professor at Idaho State University, is reluctant to use the phrase Christian terrorist, so he calls Rudolph "a religiously inspired terrorist".

Dr. George Tiller, one of the few doctors in the United States who performed abortions late in pregnancies, was a frequent target of anti-abortion violence and in 2009, he was killed by Scott Roeder as he stood in the foyer of his church. A witness who was serving as an usher alongside Tiller at the church that day told the court that Roeder entered the foyer, put a gun to the doctor's head and pulled the trigger. At trial, Roeder admitted to killing Tiller and he said that he did it in order to protect the lives of unborn babies. He was convicted of first-degree murder and sentenced to life in prison. At his sentencing, he told the court that God “will avenge every drop of innocent blood, ” and he also stated that God’s judgment against the United States would “sweep over this land like a prairie wind.”

Tiller was shot once before, in 1993, by Shelley Shannon, an anti-abortion activist who compared abortion providers to Hitler and said that she believed that "justifiable force" was necessary to stop abortions. Shannon was sentenced to 10 years in prison for the shooting of Tiller and she later confessed to vandalizing and burning a string of abortion clinics in California, Nevada and Oregon.

James Kopp was convicted of the murder of Dr. Barnett Slepian, an obstetrician who provided abortion services in the Buffalo area, and he has also been named as a suspect in the shooting of several abortion providers in Canada. Kopp hid in the woods behind Slepian's home in October 1998 and shot him through the window with a high-powered rifle, killing him as he stood in his kitchen with his family. Slepian had just returned from a memorial service for his father when he was killed. Kopp spent almost two and a half years on the run in Mexico, Ireland and France before he was captured and extradited to the United States in 2001. He was convicted on a state charge of second-degree murder in 2003 and sentenced to serve 25 years in prison. In 2007, he was convicted on a separate federal charge and sentenced to life in prison. The Canadian authorities also consider Kopp a suspect in several nonlethal attacks on Canadian abortion service providers because they believe that he shot through the windows of their homes. He was charged with the 1995 attempted murder of Dr. Hugh Short, an abortion service provider in Ontario, but the charges were dropped after he was convicted in New York. The police in Canada also named him as a suspect in the 1997 shooting of Dr. Jack Fainman in Winnipeg and they also named him as a suspect in the 1994 shooting of Dr. Garson Romalis in Vancouver, which was the first attack on an abortion provider in Canada.

The November 2015 Colorado Springs Planned Parenthood shooting, in which three people were killed and nine people were injured, was described as "a form of terrorism" by Colorado Governor John Hickenlooper. The gunman, Robert Lewis Dear, was described as a "delusional" man because on a cannabis internet forum, he had written that "sinners" would "burn in hell" during the end times, and he had also written about smoking marijuana and propositioning women for sex. He had praised the Army of God, stating that attacks on abortion clinics are "God's work". Dear's ex-wife said that he had put glue on a lock of a Planned Parenthood clinic, and in court documents which pertained to their divorce, she said "He claims to be a Christian and is extremely evangelistic, but does not follow the Bible in his actions. He says that as long as he believes he will be saved, he can do whatever he pleases. He is obsessed with the world coming to an end." Authorities said that he spoke of "no more baby parts" in a rambling interview after his arrest.

The Army of God is an American Christian terrorist organization, members of it have perpetrated acts of anti-abortion violence.

Anti-minority violence 
Gary Matson and Winfield Mowder were a gay couple from Redding, California, who were murdered by Benjamin Matthew Williams and James Tyler Williams in 1999.  Neighbors said that the family of the Williams Brothers was known for its fundamentalist Christian beliefs, and they also said that recordings of sermons and religious music were frequently heard from their house. The two perpetrators of the murder are believed to have had ties to the Christian Identity movement. They were also suspected of playing a role in 18 arson attacks on three synagogues.

In 1996, three men who claimed to be Phineas priests—Charles Barbee, Robert Berry and Jay Merelle—were charged with two bank robberies and bombings at the banks, the bombing of a Spokane newspaper, and the bombing of a Planned Parenthood clinic in Washington state.  The men were antisemitic Christian Identity theorists who believed that God wanted them to carry out violent attacks and they also believed that such attacks would hasten the ascendancy of the Aryan race.

In 2015, Robert Doggart, a 63-year-old mechanical engineer, was indicted for solicitation to commit a civil rights violation by intending to damage or destroy religious property after he stated that he intended to amass weapons and attack Islamberg, an Islamic hamlet and religious community in Delaware County, New York. Doggart, a member of several private militia groups, spoke to an FBI source during a phone call and stated that he had an M4 carbine with "500 rounds of ammunition" that he intended to take to the Delaware County enclave, along with a handgun, Molotov cocktails and a machete.  The FBI source recorded him saying "if it gets down to the machete, we will cut them to shreds". Doggart had previously travelled to a site in Dover, Tennessee, which had been described as a "jihadist training camp", in chain emails and found that the claims were wrong. In April, Doggart accepted a plea bargain and stated that he had "willfully and knowingly sent a message in interstate commerce containing a true threat" to injure someone. The plea bargain was struck down by a judge because it did not contain enough facts to constitute a true threat. Doggart describes himself as a Christian minister in the "Christian National (Congregational) Church" (apparently, the National Association of Congregational Christian Churches). None of the charges against him are terrorism related, however, some groups have described his actions as such.

According to University of Auckland Professor Douglas Pratt, who is an international expert on religious terrorism, the Christchurch mosque shootings by Australian Brenton Harrison Tarrant, which killed 51 people and injured 50 more people (primarily Muslims) at the Al Noor Mosque and the Linwood Islamic Centre in Christchurch, New Zealand, were a form of "Christian terrorism" and white supremacy. Tarrant's manifesto The Great Replacement, which is named after the French far-right conspiracy theory bearing the same name, quoted Pope Urban II (who ordered the First Crusade) and demanded the retaking of Jerusalem, cited the death of 11-year-old Swedish girl Ebba Akerlund, cited NATO's involvement in Kosovo, stated Tarrant's wish that Istanbul (aka Constantinople) should be taken from Turkey so it will be back in Christian hands and he finally stated that Tarrant's main motive for the attacks was revenge against Islam. The shooter's rifles were covered with white supremacist symbols and the names of various historical non-Muslim figures who waged battles against Muslims, such as Charles Martel, Skanderbeg and Bajo Pivljanin as well as the Battle of Tours in 732 and the Battle of Vienna in 1683.

The perpetrator of the Pittsburgh Tree of Life synagogue shooting Robert Bowers cited a Bible passage about Jesus Christ on the bio of his now defunct Gab account. Similarly, the Poway synagogue shooting suspect John T. Earnest also cited Bible quotes to justify his attack and in March 2019, he burned down a mosque in Escondido, California.

See also 

 Violence related to Christianity

 The Bible and violence
 Christian eschatology
 Christian fascism
 Christian fundamentalism
 Christian Identity
 Christianity and violence
 Christian nationalism
 Christian Patriot movement
 Christian reconstructionism
 Christianism
 Christianization
 Criticism of Christianity
 Crusades
 Dominion theology
 European wars of religion
 History of Christianity
 History of Christian thought on persecution and tolerance
 Inquisition
 Just war theory
 Kinism
 Mormon fundamentalism
 Mormonism and violence
 Persecution of Christians
 Persecution of Christians by Christians
 Reconquista
 Role of Christianity in civilization
 Sectarian violence among Christians
 Spread of Christianity
 Witch-hunt
 Witch trials in the early modern period
 Salem witch trials

 General violence

 Clerical fascism
 Definitions of fascism
 Definition of terrorism
 Ethnic nationalism
 Ethnic violence
 Far-left politics
 Far-right politics
 Far-right subcultures
 Fascism
 Fascism and ideology
 Hate crime
 Hate crime laws in the United States
 Hate group
 History of terrorism
 Left-wing nationalism
 Left-wing politics
 Left-wing populism
 Left-wing terrorism
 Misogynist terrorism
 Nationalist terrorism
 Nazism
 Neo-Confederates
 Neo-fascism
 Neo-Nazism
 Political violence
 Racial nationalism
 Right-wing politics
 Right-wing populism
 Right-wing terrorism
 Supremacism

 Terrorism in other religions

 Buddhism and violence
 Creativity (religion)
 Criticism of Sikhism
 Hindutva
 Saffron terror
 Islam and violence
 Islamic fundamentalism
 Islamic terrorism
 Islamism
 Jihad
 Jihadism
 Jewish fundamentalism
 Jewish religious terrorism
 Judaism and violence
 Zionist political violence
 Wotansvolk

 General religion related

 Criticism of religion
 Fundamentalism
 History of religion
 Religious discrimination
 Religious fanaticism
 Religious intolerance
 Religious nationalism
 Religious persecution
 Religious segregation
 Religious terrorism
 Religious violence
 Religious war
 Right-wing terrorism
 Sectarian violence
 Violent extremism

References

Bibliography
 Mason, Carol. 2002. Killing for Life: The Apocalyptic Narrative of Pro-Life Politics. Ithaca: Cornell University Press.
 Zeskind, Leonard. 1987. The 'Christian Identity' Movement, [booklet]. Atlanta, Georgia: Center for Democratic Renewal/Division of Church and Society, National Council of Churches.
 Al-Khattar, Aref M. Religion and terrorism: an interfaith perspective. Greenwood. January 2003. 
 "The Armies of God: A Study in Militant Christianity" by Iain Buchanan, Publisher: Citizens International (2010),  
Introduction: The Enduring Relationship of Religion and Violence – Oxford Handbooks Online

 
Religiously motivated violence in the United States
Religious terrorism